Piva (Serbian Cyrillic: Пива) is a historical region in Montenegro, which existed as a tribe also known as Pivljani (Пивљани). It is situated in the northwestern highlands of Montenegro, bordering Bosnia and Herzegovina. 
The Piva River flows through the region. The regional center is the town of Plužine.

History

Ottoman period
Piva was a nahiya of the Ottoman Empire, mentioned in the 1476–78 defter. It was earlier mentioned in the Chronicle of the Priest of Duklja (c. 1300–10) as one of ten counties in the province of Podgorje, and in the St. Stephen Chrysobull of Serbian king Stefan Milutin (r. 1282–1321). It was part of Sanjak of Herzegovina during Ottoman rule.

The Serbian Orthodox Piva Monastery has stood in Piva since the 16th century. It has produced four Patriarchs of the Serbian Orthodox Church.

Modern
Under Prince Nicholas I of Montenegro and the Congress of Berlin recognition, in 1878 the Piva together with the Serb Herzegovinian tribes of Banjani, Nikšići, Šaranci, Drobnjaci and a large number of the Rudinjani formed the Old Herzegovina region of the new Montenegrin state.

During the Second World War, people of the region fought in both the Serbian royalist Chetnik and communist Partisan resistance movements, which fought against each other.

The tribe has since the arrest of Radovan Karadžić, the wartime Bosnian Serb president and member of the neighbourly Drobnjak tribe of Petnjica (from which the Serbian language reformer Vuk Karadžić also descends), petitioned for Tadić's excommunication from the tribe because of Karadžić's arrest. The arrest is seen as directly bad behavior against the Serbian people and from the Piva against the Drobnjak tribe, who had never before had any problems, and it is because of this Tadić's actions have been condemned.

Notable people

Bajo Pivljanin (d. 1685), Venetian guerilla leader, born in Piva
Stojan Čupić (1765–1815), Serbian revolutionary, born in Piva
Arsenije Loma (1778-1815), one of the leaders of the First Serbian Uprising
Simo and Sćepan Kecojević, soldiers, born in Boričje, Plužine
Radoman Božović, Prime Minister of Serbia 1991–93, born in Šipačno, Plužine
Ljubomir Tadić, Yugoslav and Serbian academic, born in Plužine area
Jovan Cvijić, Serbian academic, by distant paternal ancestry
patriarch Makarije Sokolović
partiarch Savatije Sokolović
vojvoda Lazar Sočica
Blagoje Adžić, Yugoslav general
patriarch Antonije
patriarch Gerasim
Spasoje Tadić
Radoje Dakić
Obren Blagojević
Jovan Vuković
Aleksandar Tijanić, by paternal ancestry
Vidoje Žarković
Milka Tadić, by paternal ancestry
Ivan Kecojević, by paternal ancestry
Dragan Mićanović, by paternal ancestry
Momčilo Bajagić, by distant paternal ancestry
Bojan Dubljević
Jelena Dubljević
Stefan Cicmil, by paternal ancestry
Milan Gutović, by paternal ancestry
Boris Tadić, by paternal ancestry
Ognjen Tadić, by paternal ancestry
Novica Tadić

References

Sources

External links
 Piva online

Tribes of Montenegro
Plužine Municipality